Random Access Music (RAM) is a New York City-based composer and performer collective. Its current members are composers Guy Barash, Seth Boustead, Nerissa Campbell, Gilbert Galindo, Masatora Goya, Zhihua Hu, Beata Moon, Allen Schulz, Frances White, and performers soprano Risa Renae Harman, baritone Seth Gilman, flutist and ryuteki player Lish Lindsey, clarinetist and hichiriki player Thomas Piercy, violinist Sabina Torosjan, violist Liuh-Wen Ting, cellist Daniel Hass, guitarist Nadav Lev, pianist Marija Ilic, pianist/composer Tengku Irfan, and pianist Marina Iwao.

Ram's Mission
To promote and produce high caliber composition and performance of music by living American composers in a variety of venues throughout New York City, with an emphasis in Queens; to continue the tradition of chamber music in the 21st century; to foster a fully-engaged and fruitful collaborative spirit between composers and performers; to nurture connections with its audience through media outreach and engaging productions; to build new audiences for new music by bringing greater awareness to the general public through outreach, education, and scholarship.

Ram'S History
RAM began as solely a composers’ collective under the aegis of the Astoria Symphony in 2005 in order to give its member-composers performance opportunities with new music ensembles and individuals that hoped to share in a more collaborative creative process. Composers and musicians hoped for a process that was on-going, fully-engaged, and fruitful for both composer and performers. Encouraged by its growth over the next 3 years, RAM incorporated into its own 501(c)3 in 2009 and has been growing ever since. In 2012, RAM expanded its operations to produce the first ever Queens New Music Festival, presenting ensembles from around the country. In 2014, RAM formed the RAM Players, a roster of musicians dedicated to and seasoned in the music of RAM composers. RAM is an active composer-performer consortium presenting concert programs every season and the Queens New Music Festival. In the past RAM has collaborated with groups such as the Anubis Saxophone Quartet, Kronos Quartet, Cadillac Moon Ensemble, loadbang, the Gotham Ensemble, Iktus Percussion, Quintet of the Americas, and Parthenia, among others; as well as individual performers as the Svrček-Ojeda piano duo, Hans Tammen, pianist Laura Barger, flutist Robert Dick, violinist Miranda Cuckson, pianist/composer Emilio Teubal, and pianist Kathleen Supove.

References 

Musical collectives